At about 7pm on 2 March 2022, a bomb exploded near a police mobile on Fatima Jinnah Road in Quetta, Balochistan, Pakistan. It killed three people and injured 25 others, leaving six of them in critical condition.

References

2022 in Balochistan, Pakistan
2022 murders in Pakistan
2022 bombing
Improvised explosive device bombings in 2022
2022
March 2022 crimes in Asia
March 2022 events in Pakistan
2022 bombing
Terrorist incidents in Pakistan in 2022